Stenocarpus heterophyllus is a species of plant in the family Proteaceae. It is endemic to New Caledonia. It is threatened by habitat loss.

References

Endemic flora of New Caledonia
heterophyllus
Endangered plants
Taxonomy articles created by Polbot